Kwee Kiat Sek (11 January 1934 – 30 August 2001) was an Indonesian footballer. He competed in the men's tournament at the 1956 Summer Olympics.

Honours

Indonesia
Asian Games Bronze medal: 1958

References

External links
 
 

1934 births
2001 deaths
Indonesian footballers
Indonesia international footballers
Olympic footballers of Indonesia
Footballers at the 1956 Summer Olympics
Sportspeople from Jakarta
Association football defenders
Asian Games medalists in football
Medalists at the 1958 Asian Games
Asian Games bronze medalists for Indonesia
Footballers at the 1958 Asian Games
Persib Bandung players
Indonesian people of Chinese descent
Indonesian sportspeople of Chinese descent
21st-century Indonesian people
20th-century Indonesian people